De Grey may refer to:
Places
 De Grey, Western Australia
 De Grey, South Dakota
People
 Aubrey de Grey (born 1963), English gerontologist
 Nigel de Grey (1886–1951), British codebreaker
 Thomas de Grey (disambiguation) 
 Thomas de Grey (1680–1765), MP for Norfolk 1715–27
 Thomas de Grey (1717–1781), MP for Norfolk 1764–74
 Thomas de Grey, 2nd Baron Walsingham (1748–1818), MP for Wareham 1774, Tamworth 1774–80 and Lostwithiel 1780–81
 Thomas de Grey, 2nd Earl de Grey (1781–1859), British Tory politician and statesman
 Thomas de Grey, 4th Baron Walsingham (1788–1839), British peer
 Thomas de Grey, 5th Baron Walsingham (1804–1870), British peer
 Thomas de Grey, 6th Baron Walsingham (1843–1919), English politician and amateur entomologist
 William de Grey, 1st Baron Walsingham (1719–1781)
 de Grey, a variant of the surname, Grey (surname)